Greaca is a commune located in Giurgiu County, Muntenia, Romania. It is composed of three villages: Greaca, Puțu Greci and Zboiu.

References

Communes in Giurgiu County
Localities in Muntenia